The 2009 UniCredit Czech Open was a tennis clay-court tournament included in the 2009 ATP Challenger Tour. Agustín Calleri was the defending singles champion, but could not get past the first round. Jan Hájek, world no. 288, came from the qualifying round and took the title in front of his home crowd by beating the top-100 player Steve Darcis in the final. Johan Brunström and Jean-Julien Rojer won the doubles event.

Singles entrants

Seeds

 Rankings are as of May 25, 2009.

Other entrants
The following players received wildcards into the singles main draw:
  Michail Elgin
  Andrey Kuznetsov
  Stanislav Vovk

The following players received entry a special Exempt into the singles main draw:
  Mikhail Kukushkin
  Illya Marchenko

The following players received entry from the qualifying draw:
  Oleksandr Dolgopolov Jr.
  Petru-Alexandru Luncanu
  Yuri Schukin
  Sergiy Stakhovsky

Champions

Singles

 Jan Hájek def.  Steve Darcis, 6–2, 1–6, 6–4

Doubles

 Johan Brunström /  Jean-Julien Rojer def.  Pablo Cuevas /  Dominik Hrbatý, 6–2, 6–3

External links
Official website
ITF search 

UniCredit Czech Open

Clay court tennis tournaments
Czech Open (tennis)
2009 in Czech tennis
June 2009 sports events in Europe